Jesús Chousal (born 7 April 1911, date of death unknown) was a Chilean cyclist. Chousal competed in the individual and team road race events at the 1936 Summer Olympics.

References

External links
 

1911 births
Year of death missing
Chilean male cyclists
Olympic cyclists of Chile
Cyclists at the 1936 Summer Olympics
Place of birth missing
20th-century Chilean people